Schellerten is a village and a municipality in the district of Hildesheim, in Lower Saxony, Germany. It is situated approximately 10 km east of Hildesheim.

Personalities 

 Christoph Daniel Ebeling (1741-1817), pedagogue, music critic and librarian, born in the village of Garmissen
 Bernhard Brinkmann (born 1952), politician (SPD), born in the village of Dinklar

References

External links 

Hildesheim (district)

la:Castra Scelerata